Patrick Herrmann (born 12 February 1991) is a German professional footballer who plays as a right winger for Bundesliga club Borussia Mönchengladbach and the Germany national team.

Club career
Born in Saarbrücken, Herrmann began playing football at FC Uchtelfangen based in nearby Illingen. At the age of 13 he joined 1. FC Saarbrücken, before transferring to Borussia Mönchengladbach in the summer of 2008.

On 16 January 2010, Herrmann made his first team debut, appearing as a substitute in a Bundesliga match against VfL Bochum. Gladbach scored less than a minute later, with Herrmann providing the assist for fellow debutant Fabian Bäcker, but went on to lose the match 2–1. Herrmann appeared 13 times in the second half of the 2009–10 season, and was rewarded with a new contract, keeping him at the club until 2014. He signed a contract to 2019. In May 2019 he further extended his contract till 2022.

International career
Herrmann has represented the German national team at every level of youth football between the under-16s and under-21s. On 24 March 2013 he was called up for the senior national team for the first time, for a 2014 World Cup qualifier against Kazakhstan.  Herrmann made his debut on 10 June 2015 at the RheinEnergieStadion in Cologne, starting the match and assisting Mario Götze's opener in an eventual 1–2 friendly defeat to the United States.

Career statistics

Club

International

References

External links
 
 
 Kicker profile

1991 births
Living people
Sportspeople from Saarbrücken
German footballers
Germany youth international footballers
Germany under-21 international footballers
Germany international footballers
Association football midfielders
Bundesliga players
Borussia Mönchengladbach II players
Borussia Mönchengladbach players
Footballers from Saarland